John Wesley "Wes" Nofire (born April 30, 1986) is a Cherokee-American politician and a former heavyweight professional boxer. During his boxing career Nofire fought under the name "The Cherokee Warrior". Nofire currently serves on the Cherokee Nation tribal council and was a candidate in the 2022 United States House of Representatives elections for Oklahoma's 2nd congressional district.

Early life

John Wesley Nofire was born on April 30, 1986 at W.W. Hastings Hospital in Tahlequah, Oklahoma on the Cherokee Nation Reservation to Sherman and Annette Nofire. 

Nofire grew up in the Welling area, and attended High school at Sequoyah High School in Tahleuqah. Sequoyah High School is an all Native American High School operated by the Cherokee Nation and is funded by Bureau of Indian Education. Nofire was on the 2004 State Champion Basketball team for Sequoyah.

Boxing career 
Nofire, began boxing in 2007 as a way to stay physically fit. As an amateur, Nofire was named Oklahoma State Champion in the Super Heavyweight Division and went on to participate in the 2010 National Golden Gloves boxing tournament as the Kansas-Oklahoma regional representative.

In 2011, Nofire moved to Miami, Florida where he met John David Jackson, a former two-time world champion. Jackson liked the natural speed and ability that Nofire brought to e encourage him to get in the ring. Nofire made his heavyweight debut on August 26, 2011 at The Joint's Xtreme Fight Night at the Hard Rock Hotel & Casino Tulsa. Nofire challenged MMA Fighter Marc Webb. Nofire knocked out Webb a uppercut to the chin 1 miniute and 22 seconds into the first round of the match.  In his second career match up Nofire would defeat David Fuller in under 41 seconds

Nofire Entrainment  
In 2013, Nofire began Nofire Entertainment Corporation, a fight promoting entertainment company.   Nofire Entainments first event was the "Cherokee Fight Club" in 2013, a ten fight event hosted at the Hard Rock Hotel and Casino in Tulsa, Oklahoma.

Retirement from boxing 
Nofire's last career fight was against Gerald Washington. Their match was on a Sunday edition of PBC on Fox Sports 1 on June 10, 2018. 32 year old  Nofire (20-1, 16 KOs) entered the matching with his only loss came to veteran journeyman Joey Abell in 2016. The fight took place at the Pioneer Event Center in Lancaster, California. The 10-round bout was mostly back and forth. Washington started off fast, landing big shots and applying pressure on Nofire. In round 3, Nofire landed some hard shots on Washington, however he recovered and took over, landing his own big shots. Nofire slowed down after landing his big shots. Washington remained in control for most of the fight. The three judges scored the bout 98–91, 97–92, and 97–92 in favor of Washington, giving him the much needed win and snapping Washington's 2-fight losing streak.

2019 Cherokee Nation Tribal Council Election  

In December 2018, Nofire announced his intention for run for Cherokee Nation Tribal Council in District 3 seat, being vacated by David Walkingstick, who was running for Principal Chief. The Cheorkee Nation Tribal Council is a  seventeen member unicameral legislature of the tribal government.  Nofire topped a field of seven candidates in the General Election that occurred on June 1, 2019 advancing himself to the July Runoff. Nofire winning 29.47% of the votes, advanced to face off Cherokee County Democratic Party Chair, Debra Proctor (29.09% of the Vote) in a July 27 run off. 

The runoff election was largely seen a proxy fight between the Hoskin/Warner faction and the Walkingstick/Frailey faction from 2019 Cherokee Nation principal chief election. Proctor was largely being supported by the Hoskin/Warner faction and Nofire being supported by the Walkingstick/Frailey faction. Nofire received endorsement from Incumbent David Walkingstick and former Cherokee Nation Principal Chad Smith . On Election Day, Nofire overcame Proctor winning 63.75% of the vote.

2022 congressional campaign
Nofire ran for Oklahoma's 2nd congressional district in 2022. He was one of sixteen candidates for the seat in the Republican primary. During the campaign, Nofire was criticized by fellow Tribal Councilor Candessa Tehee for calling the McGirt v. Oklahoma decision "the biggest threat to Oklahomans” at a Bartlesville campaign stop. She described his statements as "border[ing] on being treasonous and traitorous to Cherokee Nation.” He placed seventh and failed to qualify for the runoff.

2023 Cherokee Nation general election
Nofire announced his intent to run for Principal Chief of the Cherokee Nation in a Facebook video on January 23, 2023 with Ryan Dirteater on his ticket as deputy chief. Dirteater later announced in a February 6 post on his Facebook account that he would not be submitting his paperwork to the election board due to "unforseen personal circumstances." On February 9 Nofire filed for election with the Cherokee Nation Election Board without Dirteater on his ticket.

Electoral history

References 

1986 births
American athlete-politicians
American male boxers
Boxers from Oklahoma
Candidates in the 2022 United States House of Representatives elections
Cherokee Nation politicians
Cherokee Nation sportspeople
Living people
Oklahoma Republicans
People from Tahlequah, Oklahoma
American men's basketball players